Las Vegas Nights is a 1941 American comedy film directed by Ralph Murphy and written by Ernest Pagano, Harry Clork and Eddie Welch. The film stars Phil Regan, Bert Wheeler, Constance Moore, Virginia Dale, Lillian Cornell, Betty Brewer and Hank Ladd. The film was released on March 28, 1941, by Paramount Pictures.

This was Frank Sinatra's film debut; he appears briefly with the Tommy Dorsey Band singing "I'll Never Smile Again".

Plot

In this musical, vaudevillian sisters Norma (Constance Moore), Mildred (Lillian Cornell), and Patsy (Virginia Dale), along with Patsy's husband, Stu (Bert Wheeler), come to Las Vegas to turn an old building they inherited into a trendy nightclub. At a casino, the sisters win a tidy sum to fund their venture, but Stu loses it just as quickly. While taking out loans, they get mixed up with a scheming lawyer who wants their property for himself and they must fend him off to keep their new club running.

Cast
Phil Regan as Bill Stevens
Bert Wheeler as Stu Grant
Constance Moore as Norma Jennings
Virginia Dale as Patsy Grant
Lillian Cornell as Mildred Jennings
Betty Brewer as Katy
Hank Ladd as Hank Bevis
Henry Kolker as William Stevens Sr.
Francetta Malloy as Gloria Stafford
William 'Red' Donahue as 'Red' Donahue 
Tommy Dorsey as Tommy Dorsey 
Frank Sinatra as Singer

See also
 List of films set in Las Vegas

References

External links 
 

1941 films
American comedy films
1941 comedy films
Paramount Pictures films
Films directed by Ralph Murphy
American black-and-white films
1940s English-language films
1940s American films